Andre Garcia may refer to:
 Andre Garcia (brand), a luxury cigar case brand
 Andre Garcia (actor) (born 1999), Filipino actor
 André Luís Garcia (born 1979), Brazilian footballer

See also
 Andrés García (disambiguation)